Water Science and Technology is a monthly peer-reviewed scientific journal covering all aspects of the management of water quality. It was established in 1969 and is published by IWA Publishing. The editor-in-chief is Wolfgang Rauch (University of Innsbruck).

Abstracting and indexing
The journal is abstracted and indexed in the Science Citation Index Expanded, Current Contents/Agriculture, Biology & Environmental Sciences, Current Contents/Engineering, Computing & Technology, BIOSIS Previews, Elsevier Biobase, and Scopus.

References

External links
 

English-language journals
Monthly journals
Academic journals published by learned and professional societies
Publications established in 1969
Hydrology journals
Creative Commons Attribution-licensed journals